John Lake (died 1421) of Exeter, Devon, was an English politician.

He was a Member (MP) of the Parliament of England for Exeter in October 1404 and 1411. He was Mayor of Exeter from July 1414 to October 1415.

References

14th-century births
1421 deaths
English MPs October 1404
English MPs 1411
Members of the Parliament of England (pre-1707) for Exeter
Mayors of Exeter